Paul T. Calvert is a United States Army lieutenant general who serves as the deputy commanding general and chief of staff of the United States Army Forces Command since December 2021. He most recently served as the Commander of the Combined Joint Task Force – Operation Inherent Resolve from September 2020 to September 2021. Previously, he was the Assistant Deputy Chief of Staff for Operations, Plans, and Training of the United States Army.

References

Living people
Place of birth missing (living people)
Recipients of the Legion of Merit
United States Army generals
United States Army personnel of the Gulf War
United States Army personnel of the Iraq War
Year of birth missing (living people)